Milly Mathis (September 8, 1901 – March 30, 1965) was a French actress who appeared in more than 100 films during her career. Born on September 8, 1901, as Emilienne Pauline Tomasini in Marseilles, France, she made her film debut with a small, uncredited role in the 1927 German film, Die Liebe der Jeanne Ney (English -  The Love of Jeanne Ney). Most of her parts would be in featured or supporting roles. Her final performance would be in a featured role in French film, Business (1960).  She was also an occasional performer on France's legitimate stage. She died on March 30, 1965, in Salon-de-Provence, France, and was buried in the Cimetière Saint-Pierre in Marseilles.

Filmography 

1927 - The Love of Jeanne Ney
1930 - Mephisto
1931 - Après l'amour 
1931 - Atout Cœur 
1931 - Marius
1931 - Paris Méditerranée 
1931 - Le Roi du camembert
1931 - Le Roi du cirage 
1932 - L’Amour et la Veine
1932 - Fanny
1932 - The Wonderful Day 
1932 - Simone est comme ça
1932 - Ah! quelle gare!
1932 - Maquillage
1932 - Moune et son Notaire
1932 - Prenez garde à la peinture
1932 - Madame Salamandre, voyante 
1932 - Chassé-croisé 
1933 - L'Illustre Maurin
1933 - High and Low
1933 - C'était un musicien
1933 - D'amour et d'eau fraîche
1933 - La Prison de Saint-Clothaire
1934 - The Scandal
1934 - Tartarin de Tarascon
1934 - Lac aux Dames
1934 - The Crisis is Over
1934 -   
1934 - Deux mille deux cent vingt deux CF 2 
1934 - Série 7 No 77777 
1935 - Amants et Voleurs
1935 - Lune de miel
1935 - Bout de Chou
1935 - Juanita
1935 - Gaspard de Besse
1935 - Arènes joyeuses
1935 - Suivez le guide 
1935 - La main passe 
1935 - Les frères Brothers 
1935 - A la manière de...
1935 - Américan-bar 
1936 - Une femme qui se partage
1936 - La Petite Dame du wagon-lit
1936 - L’École des Journalistes
1936 - Samson
1936 - Avec le sourire
1936 - Prête-moi ta femme
1936 - Enfants de Paris
1936 - La Rose effeuillée
1936 - Jacques and Jacotte
1936 - Prends la route
1936 - Notre-Dame d'Amour
1936 - Forty Little Mothers
1936 - César
1936 - Blanchette
1937 - Gigolette
1937 - The House Opposite
1937 - La Fessée
1937 - Life Dances On 
1937 - Liberté
1937 - Regain
1937 - Franco de port
1937 - Les Gangsters de l’exposition
1937 - Un meurtre a été commis
1937 - Un soir à Marseille
1938 - Nuits de prince
1938 - I Was an Adventuress
1938 - Légions d'honneur
1938 - Gargousse
1938 - Three Artillerymen at the Opera
1938 - Champions de France
1938 - Cavalcade d'amour
1938 - Grand-père
1938 - Vous seule que j’aime
1938 - Le Moulin dans le soleil
1939 - Whirlwind of Paris
1939 - Une main a frappé
1939 - Girls in Distress
1939 - Personal Column
1940 - The Well-Digger's Daughter
1940 - The Marvelous Night 
1940 - Chambre 13
1940 - Tobias Is an Angel
1941 - Un chapeau de paille d'Italie
1941 - La Troisième Dalle
1941 - Parade en sept nuits
1941 - Trois Argentins à Montmartre
1941 - Mélodie pour toi
1941 - La Prière aux étoiles 
1942 - Cap au large
1942 - Simplet
1943 - Coup de tête
1944 - Bifur 3
1946 - Le Charcutier de Machonville
1948 - Le Voleur se porte bien
1948 - Toute la famille était là! 
1948 - La vie est un rêve
1949 -  Night Round
1949 - Sending of Flowers
1950 - The Treasure of Cantenac 
1950 - Topaze
1950 - Bibi Fricotin
1950 - Bouquet de joie
1951 - The Convict
1951 - Au pays du soleil
1951 - The Damned Lovers
1951 - Ce coquin d'Anatole
1951 - Vol avec extraction
1952 - Le Passage de Vénus
1952 - Manon des sources
1952 - Des quintuplés au pensionnat
1953 - Trois Jours de bringue à Paris
1954 - Le Collège en folie
1957 - Three Sailors
1957 - Nous autres à Champignol
1957 - La Blonde des Tropiques
1957 - Le Désert de Pigalle
1958 - Girl and the River
1958 - Arènes joyeuses
1960 - Business

References

External links
 

French film actresses
French stage actresses
Actresses from Marseille
1901 births
1965 deaths
20th-century French actresses